Liisa Roberts (born 1969) is a Finnish-American artist. She was born in Paris, France, to a Finnish mother and an American father of Russian-Jewish descent.

Work
Roberts is known for her installation works that use film.  The visual style of her work has been called "a critique of minimalist phenomenology".  

Roberts was included in the 2015 Venice Biennale. Her work is included in the collections of the Whitney Museum of American Art and the Museum of Modern Art, New York.

References

1969 births
Living people
American installation artists
American women installation artists
20th-century American artists
20th-century American women artists
21st-century American artists
21st-century American women artists
Artists from Paris
American people of Finnish descent
American people of Russian-Jewish descent
Finnish people of American descent
Finnish people of Russian-Jewish descent